Peter Bettesworth (1670–1738) was an MP for Petersfield during the late 17th and early 18th centuries.

He was the son of Peter Bettesworth of Chidden and Elizabeth née Roberts. In 1673 he married Sandys, daughter of Sir James Worsley, 5th Baronet: They had one son. After his time as MP he pursued a military career. His last post was as Lieutenant Governor of Jersey.

References

People from Petersfield
17th-century English people
18th-century British Army personnel
1670 births
1738 deaths
British Army officers